Alexander Campbell DesBrisay (1828 – April 8, 1873) was a French Canadian businessman and politician in the Province of New Brunswick. The son of Solomon DesBrisay, and his wife, Mary Campbell, he was a descendant of Captain Théophile de la Cour DesBrisay (1671–1761) whose Huguenot family fled religious persecution in France and settled in Dublin, Ireland before emigrating to Canada.

Alexander DesBrisay was born in Bedeque, Prince Edward Island and educated at a public school. As an adult, he was a successful businessman in both the lumber and fishing industries. He married Janet Finnis with whom he had six sons and three daughters.

A supporter of the Province of New Brunswick joining the proposed Canadian Confederation, in the February 21, 1865 New Brunswick general election, DesBrisay was voted into office as the Confederation Party representative for Restigouche County in an   election won by an Anti-Confederation Party made up of a coalition of Conservatives and Reformers led by Albert James Smith.

DesBrisay was reelected in the 1866 New Brunswick general election won by his party. On August 16, 1867, Premier Andrew Wetmore appointed him to the Cabinet as a Minister without Portfolio. He held this appointment until May 25, 1870, when the Administration was re-organized under the leadership of the new Liberal-Conservative Party Premier, George E. King.

He was returned to office again in the 1870 provincial election. That fall he resigned his seat in order to run in the November 25 Federal by-election for a seat in the House of Commons of Canada for the constituency of Restigouche to replace William Murray Caldwell who had died in office. Unsuccessful in his bid for federal office, DesBrisay returned to private business but died a few years later from smallpox at Dalhousie, New Brunswick. He is buried in the Presbyterian Church Cemetery in Bathurst.

References
 Genealogy of Alexander DesBrisay
"Prince Edward Island Baptism Card Index, 1721-1885," database with images, FamilySearch (https://familysearch.org/ark:/61903/1:1:KCXD-96L : 11 March 2018), Alexander Campbell Desbrisay, 04 Apr 1829; citing p. 65, volume 1, Richmond, Prince Edward Island, Public Archives, Charlottetown; FHL microfilm 1,487,753.

1828 births
1873 deaths
Businesspeople from New Brunswick
Members of the Legislative Assembly of New Brunswick
Members of the Executive Council of New Brunswick
New Brunswick candidates for Member of Parliament
Alexander C
Infectious disease deaths in New Brunswick
Deaths from smallpox
People from Bathurst, New Brunswick
Colony of New Brunswick people